Julafton hemma was released on 11 November 1993 and is a Christmas album from Swedish dansband Wizex.

Track listing
En lång kall vinter (It's Gonna Be a Cold Cold Winter)
Nu tändas tusen juleljus
Rudolf med röda mulen (Rudolph the Red-Nosed Reindeer)
Jag drömmer om en jul hemma (White Christmas)
Hej, mitt vinterland
Dejlig er jorden|Härlig är jorden (Dejlig er jorden)
Tomten kommer snart (Santa Claus is Coming to Town)
Kom hem till jul (Comin' Home for Christmas)
Vår vackra vita vintervärld (Winter Wonderland)
Låt mig få tända ett ljus (Schlaf, mein Prinzchen, schlaf ein)
Julafton hemma (Christmas Without You)
Stilla natt (Stille Nacht, heilige Nacht)

References 

1993 Christmas albums
Christmas albums by Swedish artists
Pop rock Christmas albums
Wizex albums